Just Listen is the second extended play by South Korean singer Younha.

Background and release 
A week before the release of the album a video was revealed on the list of artists participating.

Track listing 
The track listing and credits were revealed online on the day of release.

References 

2013 albums
Younha albums